Victor Koulbak (born 12 March 1946, in Moscow, Russia) is a French painter of Russian origin. His work is heavily influenced by Renaissance masters to contemporary art.

Biography

Early Childhood 
As a child he was interested in art and drew frequently. His father was an air force pilot and his mother was a housewife. His mother eventually showed his work to the director of the Ecole des Beaux-arts in Moscow and he was admitted. The best drawings were shown in a window that gave onto the street. The first time one of his drawings was shown, he proudly asked his mother to come with him to see.  Someone had broken the window and stolen his drawing.  “This was my first artistic success” said Victor Koulbak.

At school with the Masters 
At the end of his secondary school studies and his apprenticeship with the Beaux-arts, Koulbak realized there was a gap in his schooling.  He decided to find a “Master” and stopped looking once he found a well-known artist.  From the first day, however, the student argued with his teacher and left the workshop immediately:  the master in question imposed his own style, his own aesthetic principles and personal vision, and brought nothing new from the technical point of view.  The young artist then made the most important decision of his life:  to discover by himself the principles and techniques of the old "Masters".  At first he was impressed by Pieter Brueghel the Elder, Paul Cézanne and Vincent van Gogh, but then he soon turned to Leonardo da Vinci, Michelangelo, Albrecht Dürer, Jan van Eyck, Hans Memling, and others of great skill.

Soviet censorship 
Refusing the dictates of official art: “Social Realism”, Koulbak put himself on the side of non-conformist painters, thus depriving him of lucrative orders.  So, in order to survive, he was forced to work on illustrations for books and magazines.  However, he continued to paint clandestinely, for himself and for a small group of friends, but everything became more and more difficult:  art supplies were reserved for members of the Soviet Artists Union, and others had difficulty in procuring these necessities for their work. For example, in summer there would be no green available, and in winter there would be no white.
To become a member of the Union, you had first had to have participated in two official exhibitions. The selection committees, who protected soviet realism, were exclusively made up of Party members totally faithful to the regime.  This regime became slightly more flexible during the 1970s.  Exhibitions were organized with debates and held in non-public spaces, such as the Institute of Nuclear Physics of the Academy of Sciences, but were only accessible to those holding a laissez-passer issued by the Party and the KGB. Koulbak was able under these conditions to hold two exhibitions, which were, however, closed after only two hours.

Stendhal's Syndrome 
In 1975 Koulbak left the USSR. He then went to Vienna and stayed for six months, visiting all the wonderful museums of that city. The contemplation of Brueghel’s paintings put him into a trance, so much so that he was awoken by one of the guards at the closing of the museum. He had been in front of Brueghel’s work from 11.00 in the morning until the closing of the museum in the evening, victim of Stendhal syndrome, described by Stendhal in 1878 in his book Rome, Naples and Florence.

Sweden, France and Malta 
Before leaving the USSR, Koulbak had sent several of his works to Sweden. He was invited by a gallery in Stockholm, and within one year had four exhibitions of his own in Helsingborg, Stockholm, Malmö, and Oslo.  In 1976 he moved to Paris.  Since then 25 personal exhibitions and numerous collective exhibitions have been dedicated to his art in France, Italy, Japan, Canada, Belgium, the United States of America, the United Kingdom, Germany, and Malta.  Koulbak has been a resident of Malta since the year 2000.

Body of Work

Periods 

During his "exploratory" period in Moscow from 1965 to 1975, Koulbak experimented with all types, techniques and styles.

« Surréalist » Stockholm then Paris, from 1975 to the 1980s

« Thematic » Paris from 1980 to 1990.

During his "Master’s" period in Paris, followed by Malta in the 1990s, Koulbak’s main body of work has been executed in silver point.

Techniques 
Oil, gouache, water colour, dry point, pencil, silver point, and other great skills. Koulbak uses them all in the style of the Masters of the Renaissance, adapting them to his personal aesthetic concept.

Artistic Vision 

"The Renaissance, says Victor Koulbak, represented the art at its summit.  The artist, in his representation of man, aspired to the divine.  And this could not be done without mastery. Neither before nor after this period did the artist achieve such heights.  The history of art of following periods is just a derivation.  God was at first replaced by man, and then by the painter himself as the individual placed in all his triviality at the centre of the universe. We have gone from adoration to exhibitionism.  How did we get there?  Art education as a whole needs to be re-evaluated.  We give a brush to a student and tell him “express yourself” but would we ever think to suggest such a thing to a student of the piano?  Why should it seem absurd for the piano and not for the arts?  No, in order to make a child a real artist, he needs first to learn to distinguish the beautiful from the ugly and to master his tools, to teach him techniques in order to enable him to transform his weaknesses into qualities.  And to achieve this, many years of hard and difficult work are required.  If it is not done today, the future of our world seems to me to be very dark.  By refusing beauty, we refuse civilization.  I don’t know if beauty can save the world, but without beauty, the world will not survive."

Solo exhibitions 

 1975 Sweden, Helsinborg, Briiska Galleriet
 1976 Sweden, Stockholm, Grafikhuser Futura
 1976 Sweden, Malmo, Galerie Leger
 1976 Norway, Oslo, Galerie 27
 1976 France, Paris, Galerie Etienne de Causans
 1977 France, Paris, Galerie Etienne de Causans
 1980 Japan, Tokyo, Galerie Takeishi
 1981 France, Paris, Galerie Isy Brachot
 1982 Canada, Toronto, Lavrov-Tannenbaum Gallery
 1983 Belgium, Brussels, Galerie Isy Brachot
 1984 France, Paris, Galerie Isy Brachot
 1985 Japan, Tokyo, Isetan Gallery
 1986 Italy, Rome, Studio S
 1986 U.S.A., New York, Leslie Cecil Gallery
 1987 Japan, Tokyo, Isetan Gallery
 1988 U.S.A., New York, Leslie Cecil Gallery
 1997 France, Paris, Cité des Arts
 1999 U.S.A., Arkansas, Little Rock, Arkansas Arts Center
 2000 U.S.A., New York, Beadleston Gallery
 2000 U.S.A., Los Angeles, Jan Baum Gallery
 2001 France, Paris, Musée de la Chasse et de la Nature
 2002 U.S.A., New York, Beadleston Gallery
 2002 Malta, La Valletta, National Museum of Fine Art
 2004 U.S.A., New York, W.M. Brady & Co
 2005 Great Britain, London, Portland Gallery
 2007 U.S.A., New York, W.M. Brady & Co
 2008 Great Britain, London, Portland Gallery
 2009 Malta, La Valletta, National Museum of Fine Art
 2009 Germany, Frankfurt am Main, Nathalia Laue Galerie & Edition
 2013 USA, New York, Didier Aaron Gallery
 2015 USA, Auburn, Alabama, Jule Collins Museum of Fine Art
 2015, Great Britain, London, Didier Aaron Gallery
 2016, USA, New York, Didieer Aaron Gallery

Collective exhibitions 

 1976 France, Paris, Salon des Réalités Nouvelles 
 1976 R.F.A., Esslingen a.N., Kunstverein, «Nonkonformistichse russische Maler»
 1976 France, Paris, Palais des Congrès, «La peinture russe contemporaine»
 1977 Great Britain, London Institut of Contemporary Art, «Unofficial Russian Painters»
 1977 Austria, Vienna, «Février russe»
 1977 U.S.A., Washington, «Washington International Art Fair»
 1977 Great Britain, London, Fisher Fine Art Limited, «The Figurative Approach 2»
 1977 Italy, Venice, «La Biennale di Venezia»
 1978 Japan, Tokyo, Musée d’Art Moderne de Tokio
 1979 Belgium, Brussels, Galerie Isy Brachot
 1979 Germany, Munich, «Grafeling»
 1979 France, Paris, Galerie Bellint, « Les russes à Paris » 
 1980 Suisse, Lausanne, « Peintres russes » 
 1977—1984 France, Paris, Grand Palais, «Grands et Jeunes d’aujourd’hui»
 1982 U.S.A., New York, « Bilan de l’Art Contemporain » 
 1982 U.S.A., Florida, Palm Beach, Norton Gallery
 1982 U.S.A., Florida, Pensacola Museum of Art, «Silver Point in America»
 1982 U.S.A., Arkansas, Little Rock, Arkansas Arts Center
 1982 U.S.A., Massachusetts, Springfield, Museum of Fine Art
 1984 Canada, Québec, « Bilan de l’Art Contemporain » 
 1988 U.S.A., Pittsburgh, Carnegie Mellon University
 2000 U.S.A., Los Angeles, Jan Baum Gallery
 2006 U.S.A., Savannah Georgia, Telfair Museum of Art
 2008 Great Britain, London, Art London
 2009 Austria, Vienna, Art Albertina
 2010 Born in USSR made in France, Paris, France

Notes

See also

Videos 
 2022 - Victor Koulbak and his art
 2018 - Interview about his art, 1/2
 2018 - Interview about his art, 2/2

Connected articles 
 Portrait
 Pointe d'argent
 Кульбак Виктор
 Koulbak Victor

Bibliography 
 René Huyghe, Les signes du temps et l’Art moderne, Flammarion,1985
 Gérard Xuriguera, Les Figurations, Éditions Mayer,1985
 S.Bazin, P.Nicolas, Koulbak, La jouissance apaisée des formes permanentes, Groupe Bazin, 1998
 Nicolas Bokov, Or d’Automne et Pointe d’Argent. Conversations avec Victor Koulbak, Les éditions Noir sur Blanc

External links 
Official site of Victor Koulbak

20th-century Russian painters
Russian male painters
21st-century Russian painters
1946 births
20th-century French painters
20th-century Russian male artists
French male painters
21st-century French painters
21st-century French male artists
Living people
21st-century Russian male artists